The North Iowa Huskies were a junior ice hockey team based in Mason City, Iowa.  They were a member of the United States Hockey League from 1983 to 1999.  They played their home games at North Iowa Ice Arena. They would move to Cedar Rapids and became the Cedar Rapids RoughRiders after the 1998–99 season.

Mason City would later host the North Iowa Outlaws and North Iowa Bulls.

External links
Team information

United States Hockey League teams
Ice hockey teams in Iowa
Mason City, Iowa
Ice hockey clubs established in 1983
Sports clubs disestablished in 1999
1983 establishments in Iowa
1999 disestablishments in Iowa